The 1981 German motorcycle Grand Prix was the third round of the 1981 Grand Prix motorcycle racing season. It took place on the weekend of 1–3 May 1981 at the Hockenheimring.

Classification

500 cc

References

German motorcycle Grand Prix
Motorcycle
German